Fonda Lee (born March 10, 1979) is a Canadian-American author of speculative fiction. She is best known for writing The Green Bone Saga, the first of which, Jade City, won the 2018 World Fantasy Award and was named one of the 100 Best Fantasy Books of All Time by Time magazine. The Green Bone Saga was also included on NPR's list, "50 Favorite Sci-Fi and Fantasy Books of the Past Decade".

Biography
Lee was born and raised in Calgary, Alberta, Canada and currently resides in Portland, Oregon in the United States. She attended Stanford University where she earned her MBA. Before becoming a full-time writer, she worked as a corporate strategist. Lee is a martial artist and has earned black belts in karate and kung fu.

Career
Lee's debut young adult science fiction novel, Zeroboxer, was published by Flux Books and nominated for the 2016 Andre Norton Award. It received positive reviews from Publishers Weekly and Kirkus Reviews, which described it as "top-notch science fiction and a great sports novel too".

Lee's Exo series for young adults was published by Scholastic beginning in 2017 with the first volume, Exo, which was well received by critics, was nominated for the 2017 Andre Norton Award, and won the 2018 Aurora Award for Best YA Novel in a tie. The second volume, Cross Fire, was published in 2018, was nominated for the 2019 Locus Award for Best Young Adult Novel, and won the 2019 Aurora Award for Best YA Novel.

Her 2017 short story "Old Souls", was published in Where the Stars Rise: Asian Science Fiction & Fantasy, and was nominated for the 2018 Aurora Award for Best Short Fiction and the 2018 World Fantasy Award for Best Short Fiction. Her 2020 short story, "I (28M) Created a Deepfake Girlfriend and Now My Parents Think We're Getting Married", was nominated for the 2020 Locus Award for Best Short Story.

Her debut novel for adults, Jade City, the first in The Green Bone Saga, was published by Orbit Books in 2017 to critical acclaim. Jade City won the 2018 World Fantasy Award and Aurora Award for Best Novel, and was nominated for the 2018 Nebula Award for Best Novel and 2018 Locus Award for Best Fantasy Novel. Jade City was included on Time magazine's list "The Best Fantasy Books of All Time". The second in the series, Jade War, was published in 2019, received a starred review and weekly pick status from Publishers Weekly, a starred review from Kirkus Reviews, and was nominated for the Locus Award, Dragon Award, Aurora Award, and Ignyte Award. The concluding third volume of the series, Jade Legacy, was published in 2021 and also received acclaim from readers and critics, earning a starred review and weekly pick from Publishers Weekly, a starred review from Library Journal, winning the 2022 Locus Award for Best Fantasy Novel and the 2022 Aurora Award for Best Novel, and earning a nomination for the Dragon Award for Best Novel. The Green Bone Saga series as a whole has also earned praise, earning a nomination for the Hugo Award for Best Series and being included on NPR's list, "50 Favorite Sci-Fi and Fantasy Books of the Past Decade".. In 2022, Subterranean Press published Lee's standalone novella set prior to the events of The Green Bone Saga entitled The Jade Setter of Janloon.

In 2020, it was announced that a TV series based on Jade City was being developed at Peacock, with Lee serving as a consulting producer. In July 2022, it was announced that Peacock had canceled the project, but Lee shared on Twitter that the team were seeking another service to take it up.

In 2022, it was announced that Lee's new fantasy novella, Untethered Sky, would be forthcoming from Tor.com in the winter of 2023.

Awards

Bibliography

Novels

Standalone 
Zeroboxer (Flux Books, 2015)

Exo Series 
Exo (Scholastic, 2017)
Cross Fire (Scholastic, 2018)

The Green Bone Saga 
The Jade Setter of Janloon (Subterranean Press, 2022) - standalone prequel novella
Jade City (Orbit Books, 2017)
Jade War (Orbit Books, 2019)
Jade Legacy (Orbit Books, 2021)

Short fiction
"Universal Print", first published in Crossed Genres, issue #26 (2015)
"Spectral", first published in Perehelion (2016)
"Old Souls", first published in Where the Stars Rise: Asian Science Fiction & Fantasy (2017)
"Welcome to the Legion of Six", first published in The Overcast, issue #102 (2019)
"I (28M) Created a Deepfake Girlfriend and Now My Parents Think We're Getting Married", first published in MIT Technology Review  (2020)
"The Eternal Cocktail Party of the Damned", first published in Uncanny Magazine, issue #46 (2022)
Untethered Sky, Tor.com, (expected early 2023)

See also
 List of fantasy authors

References

External links

Interviews 
 Interview: Fonda Lee, Christian A. Coleman, Lightspeed magazine, January 2018
 Fonda Lee: When the Alien Invaders Win (excerpts), Locus, July 2018
 Interview with Fonda Lee (Jade City), The Fantasy Hive, July 8, 2020
 Fonda Lee: Exclusive Interview, Sirens Conference, April 19, 2021

1979 births
Living people
21st-century American women writers
21st-century American short story writers
21st-century American novelists
American speculative fiction writers
Canadian speculative fiction writers
American women short story writers
American women novelists
Marvel Comics writers
World Fantasy Award-winning writers
Writers from Calgary
Women science fiction and fantasy writers
Women writers of young adult literature
Stanford University alumni